Yugoslavia competed at the 1983 Mediterranean Games held in Casablanca, Morocco.

Medalists

External links
Yugoslavia at the 1983 Mediterranean Games at the Olympic Museum Belgrade website
1983 Official Report at the International Mediterranean Games Committee

Nations at the 1983 Mediterranean Games
1983
Mediterranean Games